In the mathematical theory of random processes, the Markov chain central limit theorem has a conclusion somewhat similar in form to that of the classic central limit theorem (CLT) of probability theory, but the quantity in the role taken by the variance in the classic CLT has a more complicated definition. See also the general form of Bienaymé's identity.

Statement 

Suppose that:

 the sequence  of random elements of some set is a Markov chain that has a stationary probability distribution; and
In the classic central limit theorem these random variables would be assumed to be independent, but here we have only the weaker assumption that the process has the Markov property; and
  is some (measurable) real-valued function for which 
Now let 
 
Then as  we have
 
where the decorated arrow indicates convergence in distribution.

This means that
 
where ~ means "is distributed like".

Monte Carlo Setting 

The Markov chain central limit theorem can be guaranteed for functionals of general state space Markov chains under certain conditions. In particular, this can be done with a focus on Monte Carlo settings. An example of the application in a MCMC (Markov Chain Monte Carlo) setting is the following:

Consider a simple hard spheres model on a grid. Suppose . A proper configuration on  consists of coloring each point either black or white in such a way that no two adjacent points are white. Suppose our goal is to calculate the typical number of white points in a proper configuration; that is, if  is the number of white points in  then we want the value of

Fix  and set  where  is an arbitrary proper configuration. Randomly choose a point  and independently draw . If  and all of the adjacent points are black then color  white leaving all other points alone. Otherwise, color  black and leave all other points alone. Call the resulting configuration . Continuing in this fashion yields a Harris ergodic Markov chain  having  as its invariant distribution.

Implications 
Not taking into account the additional terms in the variance which stem from correlations (e.g. serial correlations in markov chain monte carlo simulations) can result in the problem of pseudoreplication when computing e.g. the confidence intervals for the sample mean.

References

Sources 
 Gordin, M. I. and Lifšic, B. A. (1978). "Central limit theorem for stationary Markov processes." Soviet Mathematics, Doklady, 19, 392–394. (English translation of Russian original).
 Geyer, Charles J. (2011). "Introduction to MCMC." In Handbook of Markov Chain Monte Carlo, edited by S. P. Brooks, A. E. Gelman, G. L. Jones, and X. L. Meng. Chapman & Hall/CRC, Boca Raton, pp. 3–48.

Markov processes
Markov models
Stochastic processes
Stochastic models
Probability theorems
 
Asymptotic theory (statistics)
Normal distribution